Defiance Mountain is a 2,669-meter-elevation (8,756-foot) summit in the northernmost Pacific Ranges of the Coast Mountains of British Columbia, Canada. It is located to the south of the Bella Coola River between the communities of Firvale and Hagensborg. Nusatsum Mountain is to its northwest and Stupendous Mountain to the northeast. The peak can be seen from Highway 20. The landform's toponym was officially adopted March 13, 1947, by the Geographical Names Board of Canada.

Climate

Based on the Köppen climate classification, Defiance Mountain is located in the marine west coast climate zone of western North America. Most weather fronts originate in the Pacific Ocean, and travel east toward the Coast Mountains where they are forced upward by the range (Orographic lift), causing them to drop their moisture in the form of rain or snowfall. As a result, the Coast Mountains experience high precipitation, especially during the winter months in the form of snowfall. Winter temperatures can drop below −20 °C with wind chill factors below −30 °C. This climate supports a glacier in the north cirque.

See also
Mount Defiance
 
 Geography of British Columbia

References

Bella Coola Valley
Pacific Ranges
Two-thousanders of British Columbia
Range 3 Coast Land District